is a former Japanese singer and actress, also known as the younger sister of Japanese singer and actress Natsumi Abe. She started her career doing commercials for Nintendo Puzzle Collection, and she has also appeared in a few TV dramas.

Biography 
Following in her sister's footsteps, Abe hit the music scene in 2003 and has achieved some success. Her debut single was "Riyū" which was released in June of that year. To date she has released a total of six singles, one novel, two full albums, three photobooks, and has also starred in three movies and two TV dramas.

In 2006, Abe and older sister Natsumi played the title roles in a Japanese TV drama about the 60's Japanese female pop duo The Peanuts. She also played the role of Chava in the Japanese production of Fiddler on the Roof.

On May 15, 2007, it was announced that Abe would replace Nozomi Tsuji in the trio Gyaruru. They released their first single, "Boom Boom Meccha Maccho!", on June 20, 2007.

On September 5, 2007, Abe participated in Kunoichi, a women's obstacle course competition, and was disqualified on the first stage.

Personal life
On November 11, 2011, it was announced that Abe married a 34-year-old content creator who mainly deals with online contents.

Discography

Singles 
2003-06-26 – 
2003-07-02 – "Our Song"
2003-10-08 – 
2004-01-28 – 
2004-08-04 –  - used as Rockman X Command Mission's opening theme.
2004-11-03 – "Everyday"

Albums 
2003-11-05 – Wishes
2004-12-01 – 4 colors

DVDs 
 2003-12-17 – A Girl ~I Wish Upon a Song~
 2004-04-07 – Asamix!
 2004-12-01 – Sweet Heaven

Appearances

Photobooks 
 2003-07-09 – 
 2004-10-24 – Four Colors
 2005-11-24 – Feeling Good?

Novel 
 2005-11-24 –

Dramas 
 2004-07-08 – 
 2004-08-21 – 
 2004-10-21 – 
 2006-05-26 – 
 2007-10-05 – 
 2008-01-06 –

Movies 
 2005-09-03 – Kamen Rider Hibiki & The Seven Senki
 2005-09-22 – 
 2005-11-25 –

Calendars 
 October 2003 – 
 September 2004 –

References

External links 
 Jdorama Abe Asami profile page

1985 births
Living people
Japanese female idols
Japanese television personalities
Japanese women pop singers
People from Muroran, Hokkaido
Singers from Hokkaido
Universal Music Japan artists
21st-century Japanese actresses
21st-century Japanese women singers
21st-century Japanese singers